Eero Berg (17 February 1898, Kangasala – 14 July 1969) was a Finnish athlete who mainly competed in the 10,000 metres during his career. He competed for Finland at the 1924 Summer Olympics held in Paris, France where he won the bronze medal in the men's 10,000 metres competition and gold in Men's Cross-Country, Team.

References

External links
sports-reference

1898 births
1969 deaths
People from Kangasala
People from Häme Province (Grand Duchy of Finland)
Finnish male long-distance runners
Olympic bronze medalists for Finland
Athletes (track and field) at the 1924 Summer Olympics
Olympic athletes of Finland
Medalists at the 1924 Summer Olympics
Olympic bronze medalists in athletics (track and field)
Olympic cross country runners
Olympic gold medalists for Finland
Sportspeople from Pirkanmaa
19th-century Finnish people
20th-century Finnish people